The Rescue is a 2020 Chinese action film directed by Dante Lam. The film follows the personal and professional lives of members from the China Rescue & Salvage, which is under the Chinese Ministry of Transport.  The film stars Eddie Peng, Wang Yanlin, Xin Zhilei, Lan Yingying, Wang Yutian, and Xu Yang. The film was initially scheduled to the released in China on 25 January 2020, but was delayed due to COVID-19 pandemic. The Rescue is the third film in a series of films directed by Dante Lam that pays tribute to Chinese public personnel, including 2016's Operation Mekong (the police) and 2018's Operation Red Sea (the navy).  The film has received financial and production backing and assistance from the Chinese Ministry of Transport.

Released on 18 December 2020, the film received generally positive reviews from critics but grossed just $74 million against a budget of $90 million.

Plot

Cast
Eddie Peng as Gao Qian
Wang Yanlin as Zhao Cheng
Xin Zhilei as Fang Yuling
Lan Yingying as Wen Shan
Wang Yutian as An Peng
Xu Yang as Bai Yang
Li Mincheng as Liu Bin
Carlos Chan as Lin Weiquan
Zhang Guoqiang as Pan Zhengjun
Guo Xiaodong (cameo appearance) as Ding Yi
Wei Daxun (cameo appearance) as Huo Da

Production

Music 

Elliot Leung was invited to return after composing the score to Operation Red Sea. The score was recorded in Synchron Stage. On December 18, Sony Classical and Milan Records released a soundtrack album consisting of 27 tracks.

Release 
The film was originally scheduled to be released on 25 January 2020 in both China and the United States, but was delayed due to the COVID-19 pandemic. It was later released on 18 December 2020.

Reception

Box office 
The Rescue grossed $8.9 million in its first day of release. Chinese audiences gave the film 9.2/10 on Maoyan, 9/10 on Taopiaopiao, and 6.6/10 on Douban. It went on to debut to $36.1 million, finishing first at the box office. Variety wrote that the total was "far below projections and could mean the film will lose money."

In the United States and Canada, the film had a limited release and ranked 25th in its opening weekend, grossing $9,674 from 65 theaters with an average of $148 per theater

Critical response 

References

External links
 
 

Films postponed due to the COVID-19 pandemic
Polybona Films films
Chinese action films
Films directed by Dante Lam
Films shot in Fujian
2020 films
2020 action films
Tencent Pictures films
IMAX films
2020s Mandarin-language films